Kyle Merber (born November 19, 1990) is a former American mid-distance runner who specialized in the mile and the 1500 metres. He was sponsored by Hoka One One and competed for the New Jersey New York Track Club before retiring from the sport in 2021.

Running career

High school
In 6th grade, Merber began sprint training with Charlie Bell, a local high school coach from New Jersey. He would practice sprinting with a bungee cord tied to him for strength development. Merber attended Half Hollow Hills West High School, where he competed in cross country and track. During high school he was successful in a wide range of events, posting personal bests of 1:53 in the 800 meters and 9:06 in the 3200 meters.

Collegiate
Merber first attended Columbia University, where he specialized in the mile and 1500. At Columbia, Merber set the Ivy League indoor mile record when he finished in 3:58.52 at the 2010 Columbia Last Chance meet at the Armory. That summer, however, Merber stepped on a piece of glass during a training run near his home on Long Island, which put him out of competition for a year. However, Merber had a resurgent senior year, and in May 2012, at the Swarthmore Last Chance Meet, he outkicked Nate Brannen to set an American collegiate 1500 meter record in 3:35.59. He graduated from Columbia in 2012.

The following school year, Merber enrolled in a masters program at the University of Texas at Austin, where he used his remaining year of NCAA eligibility resulting from his missed junior season at Columbia.

Professional
After graduating from UT in 2013, Merber joined the New Jersey*New York Track Club under coach Frank Gagliano. He is also sponsored by HOKA ONE ONE. He was a member of the United States' distance medley relay team which set the world record of 9:15.50 at the 2015 IAAF World Relays in Nassau.

Merber has been a resident of Clinton, New Jersey.

Merber announced his retirement on instagram on January 4, 2021.

Personal bests

References

External links
 The Official Blog of Kyle Merber
 IAAF Profile

Living people
1990 births
Track and field athletes from New York (state)
American male middle-distance runners
World Athletics record holders (relay)
People from Bronxville, New York
People from Clinton, New Jersey
Sportspeople from Hunterdon County, New Jersey
Columbia Lions men's track and field athletes
Texas Longhorns men's track and field athletes